Pusapati Ashok Gajapathi Raju (born 26 June 1951) is an Indian politician and the former Union Minister for Civil Aviation in the Narendra Modi Government. A scion of Royal family of Vizayanagram princely state, he is the younger son of the last Maharaja of Vizianagram. He was a member of Andhra Pradesh State legislature for over twenty five years and was a Minister in the Govt. of A.P., for thirteen years holding the portfolios of Commercial Tax, Excise, Legislative affairs, Finance, Planning and Revenue.

Personal life
Pusapati Ashok Gajapathi Raju comes from the Pusapati royal family of the Vizianagaram kingdom. He is the son of Maharaja Pusapati Vijayarama Gajapathi Raju, the last Maharaja of Vizianagram. His family is known for its philanthropy through its temples that include the famous Simhachalam temple and the Maharaja Alak Narayana Society for Arts and Sciences which runs a number of education institutions. He was educated at Scindia School Gwalior, Hyderabad Public School and V.S. Krishna College, Visakhapatnam. His father Pusapati Vijayarama Gajapati Raju and his brother Pusapati Ananda Gajapathi Raju were also Indian parliamentarians and ministers in the state government. He is a former President of Andhra Cricket Association. His efforts resulted in the establishment of several centres for imparting training in several sports at many places including Hyderabad, Visakhapatnam and Vizianagaram.

Political career
He won the Vizianagaram Vidhan Sabha constituency for the first time as Janata Party candidate in 1978. He joined the Telugu Desam Party when it was formed in 1982 and won the state assembly elections of 1983, 1985, 1989, 1994, 1999 and 2009. He won the 2014 Indian general election to the 16th Lok Sabha from Vizianagaram. He served Andhra Pradesh as a Cabinet Minister for Excise, Commercial Taxes, Finance, Revenue and Legislative Affairs in State Government. He is a Politburo member in the Telugu Desam Party. He was the Union minister for Civil Aviation in the National Democratic Alliance cabinet. He resigned on 8 March 2018 over a dispute with central government to provide special status to Andhra Pradesh.

Other Works 
He took an active part in the struggle for the formation of a new district viz. Vizianagaram. His interest to improve education in the district led to the establishment of several governmental and non-governmental educational institutions. He served as Chairman of The Maharaja Alak Narayana Society of Arts and Science (MANSAS) which is running twelve educational institutions in the district. As a Minister, he was associated with several developmental activities. He is keenly interested in the field of public health and the conservation of water and electricity. In pursuance of this ideal, he launched housing, drinking water and health schemes. He has traveled abroad to study town planning and to implement it suitably in Andhra Pradesh.

Personal life 
He is from royal Pusapati family of Andhra Pradesh and is 11th Custodian of his family. He married Suneela in the year 1974 and has 2 daughters. He is a strongman of his family and also involves in activities besides Politics.

References 

|-

1951 births
Janata Party politicians
Telugu Desam Party politicians
Living people
India MPs 2014–2019
Lok Sabha members from Andhra Pradesh
People from Vizianagaram district
Members of the Cabinet of India
Civil aviation ministers of India
Narendra Modi ministry
People from Uttarandhra